Katharina Gerlach and Julia Wachaczyk were the defending champions, but they lost to Amina Anshba and Albina Khabibulina in the quarterfinals.

Pemra Özgen and Despina Papamichail won the title, defeating Olga Danilović and Nina Stojanović in the final, 1–6, 6–2, [10–4].

Seeds

Draw

Draw

References
Main Draw

Reinert Open - Doubles
Reinert Open